Footwear refers to garments worn on the feet, which typically serves the purpose of protection against adversities of the environment such as wear from ground textures and temperature. Footwear in the manner of shoes therefore primarily serves the purpose to ease locomotion and prevent injuries. Footwear can also be used for fashion and adornment as well as to indicate the status or rank of the person within a social structure. 
Socks and other hosiery are typically worn additionally between the feet and other footwear for further comfort and relief.
Cultures have different customs regarding footwear. These include not using any in some situations, usually bearing a symbolic meaning. This can however also be imposed on specific individuals to place them at a practical disadvantage against shod people, if they are excluded from having footwear available or are prohibited from using any. This usually takes place in situations of captivity, such as imprisonment or slavery, where the groups are among other things distinctly divided by whether or whether not footwear is being worn.

In some cultures, people remove their shoes before entering a home. Bare feet are also seen as a sign of humility and respect, and adherents of many religions worship or mourn while barefoot. Some religious communities explicitly require people to remove shoes before they enter holy buildings, such as temples.

In several cultures people remove their shoes as a sign of respect towards someone of higher standing. In a similar context deliberately forcing other people to go barefoot while being shod oneself has been used to clearly showcase and convey one's superiority within a setting of power disparity.

Practitioners of the craft of shoemaking are called shoemakers, cobblers, or cordwainers.

History

Footwear has been in use since the earliest human history, archeological finds of complete shoes date back to the Chalcolithic (ca. 5000 BCE).

The Romans saw clothing and footwear as unmistakable signs of power and status in society, and most Roman citizens wore footwear, while slaves and peasants sometimes remained barefoot. The Middle Ages saw the rise of high-heeled shoes, also associated with power, and the desire to look larger than life, and artwork from that period often depicts bare feet as a symbol of poverty. Depictions of captives such as prisoners or slaves from the same period well into the 18th century show the individuals barefooted almost exclusively, at this contrasting the prevailing partakers of the scene. Officials like prosecutors, judges but also slave owners or passive bystanders were usually portrayed wearing shoes.
During the Middle Ages, men and women wore pattens, commonly seen as the predecessor of the modern high-heeled shoe, while the poor and lower classes in Europe, as well as slaves in the New World, were usually barefoot. These shoes became popular in Venice and throughout Europe, as a status symbol revealing wealth and social standing.

During the 16th century, royalty such as Catherine de Medici and Mary I of England began wearing high-heeled shoes to make them look taller or larger than life. By 1580, men also wore them, and a person with authority or wealth might be described as, well-heeled. In modern society, high-heeled shoes are a part of women's fashion and are widespread in certain countries around the world.

Materials

Modern footwear is usually made up of leather or plastic, and rubber. In fact, leather was one of the original materials used for the first versions of a shoe.  The soles can be made of rubber or plastic, sometimes having a sheet of metal inside. Roman sandals had sheets of metal on their soles so that it would not bend out of shape.

More recently, footwear providers like Nike, have begun to source environmentally friendly materials.

Components

 Adhesives
 Buckle
 Counter (footwear): Backstay fitting between upper and lining in heel area and giving structure to back of shoe and supporting ankle.
 Eyelet
 Heel
 Hook
 Insole
 Outsole
 Laces
 Shank
 Sole
 Tack
 Tongue (footwear): Part of shoe covering top of foot underneath laces
 Tread
 Welt

Types

Boots
 Boots
 Chukka boots
 Combat boots
 Cowboy boots
 Derby boots
 Fashion boots
 Go-go boots
 Hiking boots
 Motorcycle boots
 Mukluk
 Platform boots
 Riding boots
 Russian boots
 Seaboots
 Tabi boots
 Tanker boots
 Thigh-high boots
 Valenki
 Veldskoen
 Waders
 Wellington boots
 Winklepickers

Shoes

 Shoes
 Athletic shoes (also known as trainers or sneakers)
 Ballet flats
 Brothel creepers
 Court shoes (known in the US as pumps)
 Diabetic shoes
 Espadrilles
 Galoshes
 Kitten heels
 Lace-up shoes
 Derby shoes
 Oxford shoes
 Brogues
 Blucher shoes
 High-tops
 Loafers
 Mary Janes
 Moccasins
 Monks
 Mules
 Platform shoes
 Plimsoll shoes
 School shoes
 Skate shoes
 Sneakers
 Tap shoes
Toe shoes

Sandals
 Sandals
 Kolhapuri Chappals
 Peshawari chappal
 Flip-flops (thongs)
 Slide
 Wörishofer
 Avarca, from Balearic Islands

Slipper
Closed slippers
Open slippers

Specific footwear

 Ballet shoes
 Boat shoes
 High-heeled footwear
 Climbing shoes
 Clogs
 Football boots
 Sabaton
 Safety footwear
 Sailing boots
 Ski boots
 Snowshoes
 Ice skates
 Surgical shoe
 Pointe shoes
 Swimfins (flippers)
 Barefoot sandals

Traditional footwear

 Abarka, of leather, from Pyrenees
 Areni-1 shoe, 5,500-year-old leather shoe found in Armenia
 Bast shoe, of bast, from Northern Europe
 Crakow, shoes from Poland with long toes popular in the 15th century
 Galesh, of textile, from Iran
 Geta, of wood, from Japan
 Klompen, of wood, from the Netherlands
 Opanci, of leather, from Balkans
 Pampooties, of hide, from Ireland

Socks

 Socks
 Anklets
 Bobby socks
 Diabetic socks
 Dress socks
 Footwraps
 Knee highs
Toe socks
Tabi

Footwear industry

In Europe, the footwear industry has declined in the last years. Whereas in 2005, there were about 27,000 firms, in 2008 there were only 24,000. As well as the number of firms, the direct employment has decreased. The only factors that remained almost steady was the value added at factor cost and production value.

In the U.S., the annual footwear industry revenue was $48 billion in 2012. In 2015, there were about 29,000 shoe stores in the U.S. and the shoe industry employed about 189,000 people. Due to rising imports, these numbers are also declining. The only way of staying afloat in the shoe market is to establish a presence in niche markets.

Safety of footwear products

To ensure high quality and safety of footwear, manufacturers have to make sure all products comply to existing and relevant standards. By producing footwear in accordance with national and international regulations, potential risks can be minimized and the interest of both textile manufacturers and consumers can be protected.
The following standards/regulations apply to footwear products:
 CPSIA
 GB Standards such as
 GB20400－2006 Leather and fur-limit of harmful matter
 QB/T1002-2005 Leather shoes
 GB/T 15107 Athletic footwear
 EN Standards for Footwear
 ASTM Standards
 ISO standards
 AAFA Restricted Substance List
 BIS (ISI) : IS 15298-I: 2011 test methods, IS 15298 –II for safety footwear, IS 15298-III Protective footwear, IS 15298-IV Occupational Footwear

Impressions 
Footwear can create two types of impressions: two-dimensional and three-dimensional impressions. When footwear places material onto a solid surface, it creates a two-dimensional impression. These types of impressions can be made with a variety of substances, like dirt and sand. When footwear removes material from a soft surface, it creates a three-dimensional impression. These types of impressions can be made in a variety of soft substances, like snow and dirt. Two-dimensional impressions also differ from three-dimensional impressions because the latter demonstrate length, width, and depth whereas two-dimensional impressions only demonstrate the first two aspects.

See also

 American Apparel and Footwear Association
 American Podiatric Medical Association
 Boot fetishism
 List of current and defunct clothing & footwear stores in the United Kingdom
 List of footwear designers
 List of shoe styles
 Orthopaedic footwear
 Shoe fetishism
 Shoe size
 Shoes
 Walking boot

References

Further reading
  726 pages.
  190 pages.
  302 pages.

External links

 Britannica: clothing and footwear industry